Rex Cooper Ellsworth (November 15, 1907 – August 24, 1997) was a major owner in Thoroughbred racing and twice the leading breeder in the United States whose story was featured with a cover of the February 25, 1963 edition of Sports Illustrated magazine.

Racing and breeding successes
Rex Ellsworth was a young man of twenty-seven when in 1933 he entered the Thoroughbred breeding and racing business with lifelong friend and trainer, Mesh Tenney. From a start with six broodmares and two weanlings he was successful enough that before long he could afford to buy horses with solid pedigrees. In Ireland in 1947, with a view to breeding, he purchased Khaled from the stud of the Aga Khan. It would be eight years later when Ellsworth first earned national attention in 1955 when his homebred son of Khaled named Swaps won the Santa Anita Derby at Santa Anita Park in Arcadia, California then the 1955 Kentucky Derby, first leg of the U.S. Triple Crown series at Churchill Downs in Louisville Kentucky. The following year another homebred son of Khaled who was raced as Terrang provided Ellsworth with his second straight Santa Anita Derby win. Candy Spots, again one of Ellsworth's homebreds whose damsire was Khaled, gave him his third Santa Anita Derby plus a win in the second leg of the U.S. Triple Crown series when he captured the 1963 Preakness Stakes at Pimlico Race Course in Baltimore, Maryland.

In 1964, Ellsworth won Europe's most prestigious race when his newly acquired horse Prince Royal won the Prix de l'Arc de Triomphe at Longchamp Racecourse in Paris, France.

An Inglorious End
In January 1975, financial problems led to the end of Ellsworth's once great horseracing and breeding business. His farm property near Chino in San Bernardino County, California was seized by California health authorities when more than 100 horses were found near starvation along with the remains of five horses who had already died. One of the dead was Iron Reward, the 1955 Kentucky Broodmare of the Year and United States Broodmare of the Year. She was a granddaughter of War Admiral and great granddaughter of Man o' War.

References

1907 births
1997 deaths
American Latter Day Saints
American racehorse owners and breeders
Owners of Kentucky Derby winners
Breeders of Kentucky Derby winners
Owners of Preakness Stakes winners
Breeders of Preakness Stakes winners
Owners of Prix de l'Arc de Triomphe winners
People from Safford, Arizona